Davor Taleski (Давор Талески, born May 19, 1995) is a Macedonian professional footballer who plays as a goalkeeper for FK Pelister.

References 

1995 births
Living people
Sportspeople from Prilep
Association football goalkeepers
Macedonian footballers
North Macedonia youth international footballers
FK 11 Oktomvri players
FK Metalurg Skopje players
FK Kožuf players
FK Bregalnica Štip players
FK Pobeda players
FC Honka players
Athlitiki Enosi Larissa F.C. players
Macedonian First Football League players
Veikkausliiga players
Kakkonen players
Macedonian Second Football League players
Macedonian expatriate footballers
Expatriate footballers in Finland
Macedonian expatriate sportspeople in Finland
Expatriate footballers in Greece
Macedonian expatriate sportspeople in Greece